"Raf" (stylized in all caps) is a song by American hip hop collective ASAP Mob, featuring American rapper and collective member ASAP Rocky alongside fellow American rappers  Playboi Carti, Quavo and Lil Uzi Vert and American singer Frank Ocean. It was released on May 15, 2017 and is the lead single from ASAP Mob's second studio album Cozy Tapes Vol. 2: Too Cozy (2017). The song pays tribute to Belgian fashion designer Raf Simons.

Background
ASAP Rocky posted a snippet of the song on Twitter in January 2017, and previewed the song again at the 2017 Rolling Loud festival. The song premiered on Frank Ocean's Blonded Radio on May 15, 2017 in two versions. It is named after fashion designer Raf Simons, whom Rocky is a longtime admirer of. When Simons was selected to be on the Time 100, Rocky wrote for Time:

I feel like Raf Simons is important for the culture based on the fact that he built a whole new religion around fashion. It's to the point where kids, male and female alike, will get in full arguments over why he's the greatest. And it's amazing how his prior work, his archive, is more important and relevant than anything that's out today.

Content
In the song, ASAP Rocky sends warnings to not touch his designer clothing, notably Raf Simons-designed ones. Throughout Rocky's verse, Playboi Carti provides background vocals with ad-libs. The other artists each rap about owning designer clothes, also warning not to get close to their expensive garment.

The two versions of the song that were originally released featured different verses from Frank Ocean. One version features a hook from Rocky, on which he raps, "Please don't touch my Raf."

Music video
The music video was released on July 24, 2017. Directed by Alec Eskander, it finds ASAP Rocky, Playboi Carti and Quavo modeling clothes from Raf Simon's archive. Simon's Fall/Winter 1995-1996 and Spring/Summer 2002 collections are referenced in the clip. The video uses a shortened version of the song which excludes Lil Uzi Vert and Frank Ocean's verses.

Charts

Certifications

References

2017 singles
2017 songs
ASAP Mob songs
ASAP Rocky songs
Playboi Carti songs
Quavo songs
Lil Uzi Vert songs
Frank Ocean songs
RCA Records singles
Songs written by ASAP Rocky
Songs written by Playboi Carti
Songs written by Quavo
Songs written by Lil Uzi Vert
Songs written by Frank Ocean
Songs written by Michael Uzowuru
Posse cuts